Zyg Brunner, also known as Zygismund Brunner, or Sigismond Leopold (12 November 1878, Warsaw - 7 April 1961, Paris) was a Polish draftsman, caricaturist, and illustrator. Zyg arrived in Paris, France at the turn of the century and had his first art exhibition in 1905 at the age of twenty-seven. He submitted works to the Gazette du Bon Ton and created illustrations for children's books such as Grimm's Fairy Tales, as well as for risqué novels. He worked for La Vie Parisienne, Fantasio, La Baïonnette, Le Rire, Le Sourire, and many other publications. Anatole France had him illustrate his novel Abeille.

1878 births
1961 deaths
Polish draughtsmen
French illustrators
French erotic artists
Polish erotic artists
French caricaturists
Polish caricaturists
Polish illustrators
Polish people of French descent
Congress Poland emigrants to France